Atharabari Union is a union parishad under Ishwarganj Upazila of Mymensingh District in the division of Mymensingh, Bangladesh. It has an area of 20.197 square kilometres and a population of 30,322.

Demographics 
The total area of Atharbari Union is 5463 acres. According to the National Bureau of Statistics of Bangladesh census report, the total population of the union in 2001 was 30,322, of which the number of men and women was 15,475 and 14,847 respectively.

References

Unions of Ishwarganj Upazila